John McLeod (born 1931) is a Jamaican cricketer. He played in three first-class matches for the Jamaican cricket team in 1951/52 and 1952/53.

See also
 List of Jamaican representative cricketers

References

External links
 

1931 births
Living people
Jamaican cricketers
Jamaica cricketers
Cricketers from Kingston, Jamaica